Ascot railway station is located on the Pinkenba line in Queensland, Australia. It serves the Brisbane suburb of Ascot adjacent to Eagle Farm Racecourse.

History
Ascot station opened on 3 September 1882 as Hendra Siding coinciding with that of the Pinkenba railway line. It was later renamed Racecourse and eventually renamed as Ascot. The line was electrified on 6 February 1988. All passenger services on the line were suspended on 27 September 1993 as part of a statewide rationalisation of the rail network with the closing or suspending of under-utilised or unprofitable rail lines. Trains continued to serve Ascot when major race events were held.

Passenger services resumed on 27 January 1998, but only as far as Doomben with bus connections to the other abandoned stations.

Heritage listing
A combined entry for Eagle Farm Racecourse and Ascot Railway Station was listed in the Queensland Heritage Register in 2004.

Services
Ascot station is served by all stops Doomben line services from Doomben to Roma Street, Park Road and Cleveland.

Services by platform

References

Notes

External links

Ascot station Queensland Rail
Ascot station Queensland's Railways on the Internet
[ Ascot station] TransLink travel information

Ascot, Queensland
Railway stations in Australia opened in 1882
Railway stations in Brisbane
Queensland Heritage Register
Heritage of Brisbane
Listed railway stations in Australia